Maharashtra Sahitya Parishad is a literary institution situated in the Indian state of Maharashtra for the purpose of the "furtherance of Marathi language and literature". It was established in Pune in 1906. The Encyclopedia of Indian Literature considers it as Marathi's first representative literary body. The Parishad arranges annual conferences runs Maharashtra Sahitya Patrika a Marathi quarterly, provides a reference library, conducts qualifying examinations in Marathi language and literature and classes for non-Marathi speakers in Pune. It has undertaken the publishing a History of Marathi literature. It has constituted various awards in the field of literature. The Parishad according to Deshpande lead in the demand for the formation of a separate linguistic state – Maharashtra.

References

Indic literature societies
Organisations based in Pune
Marathi language
Organizations established in 1906
1906 establishments in India
Language advocacy organizations
Language regulators